Janko Lukovski (born 7 April 1946) is a former Macedonian professional basketball player and coach who played for Rabotnički and MZT Skopje.

References

External links
 Sport Key
 Video Sample

1946 births
Living people
Macedonian men's basketball players
Macedonian basketball coaches
Macedonian expatriate basketball people in Serbia
Sportspeople from Skopje
Serbian people of Macedonian descent
KK Vojvodina coaches
KK Spartak Subotica coaches
KK Sutjeska coaches
KK Borovica coaches
KK Profikolor coaches
Shooting guards